Caiçara is a municipality in the Brazilian state of Paraíba.

References 

Populated places established in 1908
1908 establishments in Brazil
Municipalities in Paraíba